Antonio Quistelli (23 August 1949 – 11 May 1998) was an Italian wrestler. He competed in the men's Greco-Roman 48 kg at the 1976 Summer Olympics.

References

External links
 

1949 births
1998 deaths
Italian male sport wrestlers
Olympic wrestlers of Italy
Wrestlers at the 1976 Summer Olympics
Sportspeople from Bari
20th-century Italian people